Toku may refer to:

Toku, Estonia, a village in Urvaste Parish, Võru County, Estonia
Tokū, Tonga, an uninhabited volcanic island in Tonga
Toku Hime (1565–1615), Japanese princess during the Sengoku and Edo periods
Toku Nishio (1939–2005), Japanese actor and voice actor
Toku (musician) (born 1973), Japanese jazz musician
Tokusatsu, a genre of Japanese live action film or television series featuring kaiju, superheroes or mecha
Toku (TV network), an American anime television network